Denis Aleksandrovich Yachmenev (born 6 April 1984) is a Russian professional ice hockey player who currently plays for Rubin Tyumen of the Supreme Hockey League (VHL). He is the younger brother of former Los Angeles Kings and Nashville Predators forward Vitali Yachmenev.

Career
Yachmenev began playing junior hockey in the Ontario Hockey League with the North Bay Centennials, who drafted him in the 1st Round (26th overall) of the 2001 CHL Import Draft. He was then drafted 200th overall by the Florida Panthers in the 2002 NHL Entry Draft. He spent one more season in the OHL for the Saginaw Spirit before returning to Russia for the 2003–04 to join Amur Khabarovsk of the Russian Superleague.

The team were relegated from the Superleague that season but Yachmenev remained with the team in the second-tier Vysshaya Liga for the next two seasons. He then returned to the Superleague in 2006 with Sibir Novosibirsk for one season before moving to Traktor Chelyabinsk the following season. He played eight games for Traktor in the newly created Kontinental Hockey League in the 2008–09 KHL season before spending the remainder of the season with their secondary team.

Career statistics

References

External links

1984 births
Living people
Amur Khabarovsk players
HC Sibir Novosibirsk players
Florida Panthers draft picks
North Bay Centennials players
Rubin Tyumen players
Russian ice hockey left wingers
Saginaw Spirit players
Sportspeople from Chelyabinsk
Traktor Chelyabinsk players
Tsen Tou Jilin City players